Joseph Aloysius Burke (December 7, 1867 – November 3, 1940) was a Major League Baseball Infielder. He played professionally for the St. Louis Browns and the Cincinnati Kelly's Killers of the American Association in three games during the 1890 and 1891 baseball seasons.

Biography
Burke was born in Nashville, Tennessee. He played his first professional game on September 26, 1890, with the St. Louis Browns. He remained active in the minor leagues through 1899.

Burke died on November 3, 1940 in Cincinnati and is interred at St. Joseph New Cemetery in Cincinnati.

References

External links

Baseball Almanac
Baseball-Reference.Com

Major League Baseball third basemen
St. Louis Browns (AA) players
Cincinnati Kelly's Killers players
Baseball players from Tennessee
1867 births
1940 deaths
19th-century baseball players
Dayton Reds players
Chattanooga Chatts players
Nashville Tigers players
Atlanta Atlantas players
Evansville Black Birds players
Portsmouth Browns players
Evansville Brewers players
Mansfield Haymakers players
Syracuse Stars (minor league baseball) players
Dayton Veterans players
Grand Rapids Furniture Makers players
Springfield Wanderers players
Columbus Senators players